Jumbo (1944–2004) was a Bangladeshi film actor who had acted in negative roles in many Dhallywood movies.

Birth and Family Life 
Jambu was born in 1944 in Dinajpur. He is also known as 'Sukhlal Babu', 'Babul Gomez'. He grew up in Metharpatti in Parbatipur area of Dinajpur. He also worked as a laborer. Producer Delwar Jahan named him 'Jambu' in the film as he is chubby and obese. Jambu is the father of two sons and two daughters.

Movie Career 
Jambu is a popular and well-known actor in Bangladeshi films. His name is well known to everyone, young and old. It is said that he used to live at Metharpatti in Parbatipur town of Dinajpur town in North Bengal. He came to Dhaka in search of work and accidentally got involved in film.

Selected filmography
 Ghatok 
 Kalia
 Bondhu
 Saja
 Dost Dushman
 Rakhal Raja
 Noyoner Alo
 Bojropat
 Khuner Bodla
 Angar
 Biplob
 Jodhdha
 Ovijan
 Usila
 Nishpap
 Amor
 Mrityodondo 
 Jyoti
 Sathi
 Murkho Manob
 Den Mohor
 Prem Diwana
 Chakor
 Bobi
 Rajlakshmi Srikanto
 Dayi Ke?
 Miss Lanka
 Sagorika
 Nirmom
 Atmorokhkha
 Poribar
 Sontras
 Otikrom
 Nabab Sirajuddoula
 Utthan Paton
 Nayon Moni 
 Habildar
 Bijoy
 Jhumur
 Gola Barud
 Bagha Baghini
 Samor
 Aparajito Nayok
 Aposh
 Bijli Tufan 
 Matir Ful
 Palki 
 Rubel Amar Nam
 Achol Bondi
 Tiger
 Khalnayok
 Boner Raja Tarzan
 Hero
 Raja Babu
 Noya Layla Noya Mojnu
 Shikar
 Shotru Dhongsho
 Atmotyag
 Sagor Vasa
 Ek Mutho Bhat
 Rokter Dag
 Sheeshnag
 Selim Javed
 Hasan Tarek
 Nirdosh
 Mohammad Ali
 Dhormo Amar Ma
 Dakat
 Nabab
 Rasta
 Rastar Raja
 Rocky

References

External links
 

1944 births
2004 deaths
Bangladeshi actors
20th-century Bengalis
People from Parbatipur Upazila